Nehru Jackets is the first solo mixtape by American rapper Himanshu. It was released on Himanshu's own Greedhead Music label on January 17, 2012.

Rolling Stone named the song "Womyn" the 36th best song of 2012.

Background
Himanshu released Nehru Jackets in collaboration with SEVA NY to draw attention to the redistricting battle in Queens, New York. Guests on Nehru Jackets include Despot, Danny Brown, Childish Gambino, Fat Tony, and Mr. Muthafuckin' eXquire. In an interview with Rolling Stone, he explained the creation process: "with Mike [Finito], I just kind of let him do his thing. I told him I wanted Indian stuff, and he cooked it up. Mike just gave me, like, 40 beats and I fucked with whatever I liked." The mixtape's cover is a parody of the packaging of Parle-G biscuits.

Critical reception

Zach Kelly of Pitchfork commented that "Nehru Jackets as a whole is pretty loose, filled with free-associative raps that find Heems in various states of alertness, sobriety, and engagement." He added, "[Mike] Finito's work is one of the tape's strengths, but it also leaves Heems with a lot of ground to cover, and much of the material ends up feeling unfocused."

Accolades

Track listing

References

External links
 

2012 mixtape albums
Debut mixtape albums
Heems albums
Greedhead Music albums